Jalmajerd-e Jadid (also Romanized as Jalmājerd-e Jadīd, Jolmājerd-e Jadīd, and Jolmājerd Jadīd; also known as Jalmājerd) is a village in Galehzan Rural District, in the Central District of Khomeyn County, Markazi Province, Iran. At the 2006 census, its population was 798, in 267 families.

References 

Populated places in Khomeyn County